KJCS (103.3 FM) is a radio station broadcasting a country music format. Licensed to Nacogdoches, Texas, United States, the station serves the Lufkin-Nacogdoches area. The station is currently owned by Radio Licensing.

History
KJCS was first proposed by J.C. Stallings in October 1966. The requested application called for the facility to operate at 51 kilowatts ERP, with an elevation of 360 meters height above average terrain, from a transmission site 1.5 miles south of the City courthouse in Nacogdoches. The facility received the initial callsign of KEEE-FM on January 3, 1967, as it was at the time the sister to 1230 KEEE in Nacogdoches. The facility was built and received a License to Cover on August 23, 1967. KEEE-FM's original studio location is 300 East Main Street. B.C. Barbee of Nacogdoches was the engineer of record for the construction of KEEE-FM.

KEEE-FM would change call sign to  KEFM on October 17, 1968.

On October 23, 1973, an involuntary transfer of license was filed with the FCC to change the licensee of the facility to Evelyn Stallings, after the death of her husband J.C. Stallings. In honor of J.C., on Christmas Eve 1973, the call letters of the station were changed to the current KJCS.

The station was sold by Evelyn Streetman (née Stallings) to R&H Broadcasting on August 25, 1982.

KJCS has been owned by Radio Licensing, Inc. of Lufkin since 2017, having purchased the facility from Tricom Broadcasting, Inc.. Carolyn G. Vance is the current licensee.

References

External links
 

JCS
Radio stations established in 1971